The CZAW Mermaid is an amphibious flying boat light-sport aircraft produced by Czech Sport Aircraft in the Czech Republic.

Design and development
The Mermaid has a composite hull and aluminum wings, with pusher configuration engine and a cruciform tail. The standard engine is the  Jabiru 3300 four-stroke powerplant.

By December 2012 the aircraft was no longer offered for sale by CSA.

Specifications (CZAW Mermaid)

References

2000s Czech sport aircraft
Light-sport aircraft
Flying boats
Single-engined pusher aircraft
Mermaid